Snip and Snap was a 1960 British animated series from Halas & Batchelor. It was directed by the Danish paper sculptor Thok Søndergaard (Thoki Yenn) and John Halas. It featured the exploits of a dog (Snap) made of paper and pair of scissors (Snip).

References

External links 
 Top Dogs, one of the prizewinning episodes of Snip and Snap
"Snip and Snap" on Toonhound
 

British children's animated television shows
1960s British animated television series
1960 British television series debuts
1960 British television series endings
Television characters introduced in 1960
Fictional objects
Animated television series about dogs
Television series by Halas and Batchelor